The Huntsville Red Birds were a minor league baseball team that represented Huntsville, Arkansas in the Arkansas State League during the 1935 baseball season. The franchise relocated to become the Monett Red Birds for the 1936 season.

History
Minor league baseball began in Huntsville, Arkansas when the 1935 Huntsville "Red Birds" began play as a minor league affiliate of the St. Louis Cardinals. 

Huntsville became members of the six–team Class D level Arkansas State League and placed last in the standings in their one season of minor league play. Huntsville ended the 1935 Arkansas State League  season with a record of 41–63, to place 6th in the Arkansas State League standings. Huntsville finished 22.5 games behind the 1st place Siloam Springs Travelers and were managed by James Nicely, Charley Wilson, George Ruff and William Werner.

After the 1935 season, the franchise relocated to become the Monett Red Birds for the 1936 season. As a result of the move, the Arkansas State League became the Arkansas-Missouri League beginning in 1936.

Huntsville, Arkansas has not hosted another minor league team.

Year–by–year record

Notable alumni
No alumni of the 1935 Huntsville Red Birds advanced to the major leagues.

External links
Baseball Reference

References

Baseball teams established in 1935
Defunct Arkansas State League teams
Professional baseball teams in Arkansas
1935 establishments in Arkansas
1935 disestablishments in Arkansas
Defunct baseball teams in Arkansas
Baseball teams disestablished in 1935
St. Louis Cardinals minor league affiliates
Madison County, Arkansas